Brown sauce is a condiment commonly served with food in the United Kingdom and Ireland, normally dark brown in colour. The taste is either tart or sweet with a peppery taste similar to that of Worcestershire sauce.

Brown sauce is typically eaten with meals such as full breakfasts, bacon sandwiches and chips.

A combination of malt vinegar (or water) and brown sauce known simply as sauce or chippy sauce is popular on fish and chips in Edinburgh, Scotland.

History  
The first brown sauce was HP Sauce, invented in the United Kingdom by Frederick Gibson Garten in the 1890s in Nottinghamshire. An alternative claim states that an earlier brown sauce was created in Leicestershire by David Hoe in the 1850s, who sold his recipe to Garten.

Another sauce, Yorkshire Relish, is of a similar style to brown sauce and originated in Leeds, England in 1837, and is relatively unknown in the UK today. 

A recipe for "sauce for steaks" composed of ale, wine, ketchup, black pepper and butter appeared in an 1843 cookbook published in London entitled English Cookery.

Common brands

 HP Sauce
 A.1. Sauce
 Daddies

In the United Kingdom 
HP Sauce is the earliest brown sauce, and is the most popular brown sauce in the United Kingdom, accounting for around 75% of sales. Daddies, OK Sauce and Wilkin & Sons are other popular brands. Another is Hammonds of Yorkshire, popular in Northern England.

In Ireland 
Chef and HP Sauce are popular brown sauce brands in Ireland. Another sauce, Yorkshire Relish, is a similar style of sauce that originated in Leeds, England in 1837, and is now produced in Ireland and is currently manufactured in County Dublin under the YR Sauce brand.

Generic brands 
Most supermarket chains in the UK and Ireland also stock their own brand of brown sauce. As with other condiments like ketchup, mayonnaise, and mustard, brown sauce is widely available in catering sachets and dispenser bottles in restaurants.

Similar products
Many countries have their own sauces which are similar to brown sauce, often containing comparable flavour profiles, ingredients, and uses. Examples include Japan's tonkatsu sauce and Jamaica's Pickapeppa sauce. In China, a similar soy-based sauce thickened with potato or corn starch is also known as "brown sauce" (棕色酱 or "Zōngsè jiàng"). "Steak sauce" is a similar product in the United States.

Popularity 

References

British condiments
 
Irish cuisine
Umami enhancers

pl:Brown sauce